Richard Holm may refer to:

 Dick Holm, American CIA operations officer
 Richard Holm (tenor) (1912–1988), German operatic tenor
 Richard H. Holm (born 1933), American inorganic chemist